Yahya Ibn Ibrahim (c. 1048) was a leader of the Godala tribe in the Adrar plateau modern day Mauritania. Yahya Ibn Ibrahim's primary significance was in his involvement with Abdallah ibn Yasin, a Berber Muslim theologian who founded the Almoravid movement.

Background 
The Godala were a Berber tribe of the Sanhaja. They lived closest to the coast, beyond the Lamtuna. These tribes rose to proclaim the truth, to repel injustice and to abolish all non-canonical taxes (magharim). They were Sunnis, strict adherents of the school of Malik ibn Anas.

Abdallah ibn Yasin began to call people to holy war and made them proclaim the truth.

As described by Al-Bakri Yahya Ibn Ibrahim went on the Pilgrimage to Mecca and during his return journey met a jurist (Abu Imran al-Fasi). Al-Fasi was interested in the religious doctrines and customs of Ibrahim's native country. Al-Fasi found Ibrahim "wholly ignorant, though avid to learn, full of good intentions and firm of faith" 

From Al- Bakri:
 

Abu Imran could not find anyone among those he deemed fit. So he sent Ibrahim to find Waggag Ibn Zalwi of the Maluksus  Ibrahim followed Abu Imran's advice and visited Zalwi. Zalwi recommended a man called Abdallah ibn Yasin.

Fallout 
Abdallah ibn Yasin remained among the Godala, but considered their conduct sinful. They turned hostile to him later on because they found him too strict in his religious teachings. They refused to abide by his legal opinions and counsel. ;;;

Ibn Yasin visited Waggag who took the following action:

References 

11th-century Berber people